Andrés Molteni and Hans Podlipnik were the defending champions but chose not to defend their title.

Federico Coria and Tomás Lipovsek Puches won the title after defeating Sergio Galdós and Máximo González 7–5, 6–2 in the final.

Seeds

Draw

References
 Main Draw

Campeonato Internacional de Tenis de Campinas - Doubles